Chris Walker may refer to:

Charles Walker (British politician) (born 1967), also referred to by his nickname Chris
Chris Walker (actor) (born 1964), British actor
Chris Walker (basketball, born 1969), American basketball coach
Chris Walker (basketball, born 1994), American basketball player
Chris Walker (cyclist) (born 1965), British former racing cyclist
Chris Walker (footballer) (born 1973), Northern Irish footballer
Chris Walker (motorcyclist) (born 1972), English motorcycle racer
Chris Walker (musician), American R&B singer
Chris Walker (rugby league) (born 1980), Australian rugby league footballer
Chris Walker (squash player) (born 1967), English squash player
Chris Walker (wrestler), professional wrestler
Christian Walker (baseball) (born 1991), American professional baseball player
Chris Walker, antagonist of the horror game Outlast

See also
 Christopher Walker (disambiguation)